The Queen Sofía Spanish Institute is an organization in New York City, founded to promote the culture of spanish-speaking countries and foster their relations with the United States.

History 
On May 18, 1954, the institute was incorporated as a non-political, non-profit organization under the laws of the State of New York. Its mission is to stimulate interest in the culture, history and customs of Spain and other Spanish-speaking countries in the United States, and vice versa.

In 1965, the Marquesa de Cuevas, the philanthropist Margaret Rockefeller Strong, saved the landmark building 684 Park Avenue from destruction. The asking price for this building was $48 million but with the economic support of Margaret Rockefeller Strong and that of the McMicking Foundation, the institute was able to make this building its headquarters.

On October 26, 1978, the institute's Gold Medal Dinner was established in order to recognize individuals who have contributed to the international appreciation of Spain and Ibero-America through their achievements in such varied disciplines as international relations, science, business, the arts, literature, and philanthropy. The first honorees of 1978 were Henry Ford II and Andrés Segovia (in absentia).

The institute was renamed in 2003, to recognize Queen Sofía of Spain as its patroness.

In 2014, the institute strategically decided to sell its building in order to carry on with its mission.

Since the sale of the building, the Queen Sofia Spanish Institute has revitalized its activities with other Spanish and Latin American schools/organizations by cosponsoring lectures, educational programs and other culturally relevant activities. In 2018, the Institute formed a partnership with the Hispanic Society to provide a Maps and Globes educational program in New York City Public Schools of District 6. Other partners of the Institute include the Instituto Cervantes, Hunter College, Juilliard, The Spanish Consulate and the Americas Society.

The institute holds an annual ceremony to present the "Sophia Award for Excellence". This award pays tribute to a person or an organization that has actively contributed to the international appreciation of Spain and the Americas through a donation of time, expertise and innate wisdom in the areas of science, arts or the humanities.

The president and CEO is David Askren and the executive director since September, 2017 is Patrice Degnan Erquicia.

Background

Queen Sofía Spanish Institute, Inc. (the “Institute”) is a non-profit corporation founded in 1954 to stimulate American's interest in the Art, Culture, Customs, language, literature and history of the Spanish speaking world and to promote, among the Spanish-speaking peoples of the world; knowledge and understanding of ideals, culture and customs of the people of the United States, to the end that ties of friendship may be formed, mutual understanding promoted, and bonds of peace strengthened.

Cultural events

The Institute holds a wide variety of artistic endeavors, including the co-sponsoring of exhibitions and lectures on important artistic movements, artistes and their works. Along with visual arts; the institute strives to support performance art as well, including concerts, performances, and lectures on the relevance of this art in today's society. The institute also holds gastronomy events in order to enrich American's knowledge of foods of the Spanish-speaking world and to bring people together.

The Institute holds a bi-annual translation prize to recognize translators who have successfully translated a work from Spanish to English and helped to make knowledge accessible including historical and educational lectures in order to enrich American's understanding and knowledge of the Spanish-Speaking World.

Gala Gold Medalists
Beginning in 1978, The Queen Sofía Spanish Institute's Gold Medal was annually awarded to Americans and Hispanic people in recognition of their contributions to the betterment of relations between the United States and the Spanish Speaking World. This event brought together an array of international and American leaders and benefactors for a festive night of celebration. The Gala was a major source of funds for the activities of the institute.

In 2003, to mark the 50th Anniversary of the institute, the 50th Anniversary Commemorative Medal was awarded to His Majesty King Juan Carlos I and Her Majesty Queen Sofia of Spain.

The Institute no longer holds a Gold Medal Gala.

The recipients of the Gold Medal were:

 1978 - Henry Ford II, Andrés Segovia
 1979 - George S. Moore, Carlos Romero Barceló
 1980 - Alicia de Larrocha, James A. Michener
 1981 - Plácido Domingo, Margaret Rockefeller de Larraín
 1982 - Ramón Castroviejo, John Davis Lodge, Severo Ochoa
 1983 - Juan Antonio Samaranch, Roger B. Smith
 1984 - Infante Juan, Count of Barcelona
 1985 - Victoria de los Ángeles, John Brademas
 1986 - Jaime de Piniés, Robert Goizueta
 1987 - Infanta Pilar, Duchess of Badajoz and Luis Gómez-Acebo, Duke of Badajoz, Carroll and Milton Petrie
 1988 - Angier Biddle Duke, Juan Luis Cebrián
 1989 - María Amalia Lacroze de Fortabat, José Carreras
 1990 - Javier Pérez de Cuéllar
 1991 - D. Wayne Calloway, Javier Godó
 1992 - Paloma O'Shea, Philippe de Montebello
 1993 - Pasqual Maragall, Oscar de la Renta
 1994 - Montserrat Caballé, Antonio Garrigues Diáz-Cañabate, Eric M. Javits
 1995 - John McGillicuddy, Ignacio Gómez-Acebo
 1996 - Martha T. Muse, John Richardson, Emilio de Ybarra y Churruca
 1997 - John Elliott, Carolina Herrera
 1998 - Valentín Fuster, Javier Solana, William C. Steere, Jr.
 1999 - Charles A. Heimbold Jr., Robert Mosbacher, Mariano Puig
 2000 - Felipe de Borbón Prince of Asturias
 2001 - Plácido Arango, Rudy Giuliani, Dave H. and Reba White Williams
 2002 - Evelyn Lauder, Jesús de Polanco, Leopoldo Rodés
 2003 - Fernando Aleu
 2004 - Richard Meier, Santiago Calatrava
 2005 - Julio Iglesias, Henry Kissinger, Beatrice Santo Domingo
 2006 - Michael Bloomberg, Mercedes Junco Calderón and (son) Eduardo Sánchez Junco, Mario Vargas Llosa
 2007 - President Bill Clinton, Penélope Cruz
 2008 - Cayetana Fitz-James Stuart, 18th Duchess of Alba, Mercedes T. Bass, José Esteve, José Fanjul
 2009 - no medals awarded
 2010 - Isak Andic, José Baselga, Diane von Fürstenberg, Joan Massagué, 2010 National Soccer Team of Spain
 2011 - Ferran Adrià, Javier Bardem, Kenneth Chenault, Mario Testino
 2012 - Norman Foster, Baron Foster of Thames Bank and Elena Ochoa, Lady Foster, Luis A. Ubiñas, Gonzalo Ulloa
 2013 - Hillary Rodham Clinton, Antonio Banderas

Translation Prize

With the aim of elevating awareness and engendering an appreciation of Spanish literature in the United States, this triennial $10,000 prize has been created by the Cultural Committee and board of directors of Queen Sofía Spanish Institute to honor the best English-language translation of a work by a Spanish author. The inaugural award, celebrating the best translation published between 2006 and 2008, was given in 2010 to Edith Grossman for her 2008 translation of Antonio Muñoz Molina's A Manuscript of Ashes.

This prize celebrates the work and dedication of the translator and the $10,000.

See also 
 Instituto Cervantes

References

External links 

 Queen Sofía Spanish Institute

Cultural promotion organizations
New York City Designated Landmarks in Manhattan
Language education in the United States
Park Avenue
Spanish culture
Upper East Side
Translation
Translation awards
Translation award winners
Language-related awards
Language advocacy organizations
Spanish-American culture in New York City
Spanish language in the United States